"Wild, Wild West" is a song by British pop rock band the Escape Club from their debut studio album, Wild Wild West (1988). The single reached  1 on the US Billboard Hot 100 the week of 12 November 1988, making the Escape Club the only British artist to have a No. 1 hit in the United States while never charting in the UK.

Background
Lead singer Trevor Steel said:

Lyrics and music
The lyrics, with phrases such as "I love her eyes and her wild, wild hair", "heading for the '90s, living in the wild, wild west", are augmented with gunshot, laser and blaster (a la Star Wars) sound effects. Critics have noted that, due to the distinct drum beat and vocal patterns during the verses, portions of the song bear a strong similarity to Elvis Costello's "Pump It Up". On the lyrical content, singer Trevor Steel said, "I guess it was just a reflection of the times, living in the '80s with all the yuppies getting rich quick and living under the fear of the Cold War and AIDS. The "Ronnie" in the song was a reference to Ronald Reagan."

Music video
The music video was banned from British television for unclear reasons. The Florida Sun Sentinel claimed it was due to sexism. At the time, band members speculated it was due to the use of disembodied limbs through special effect. They also defended the video, saying the sexism was "designed to make fun of the more overtly sexist promo videos of the era." When asked in a 2012 interview, lead singer Trevor Steel responded, "I can't remember why the video was banned in the UK, I think some kids got scared looking at the disfigured legs." One recent reviewer said of the ban and disembodied limbs, "British censors would've been acting in the public interest. [...] It's [a] pretty easy psychedelic trick-shot, and it's also pure nightmare fuel. I hate looking at it."

Track listings
7-inch, cassette, and mini-CD single
 "Wild, Wild West" – 3:59
 "We Can Run" – 3:40

UK and European 12-inch single
A1. "Wild, Wild West" (dance mix)
B1. "Wild, Wild West" (single edit)
B2. "We Can Run"

US, Canadian, and Australian 12-inch single
A1. "Wild, Wild West" (dance mix) – 7:54
A2. "Wild, Wild West" (single edit) – 3:59
B1. "Wild, Wild West" (Wild, Wild dub club) – 7:20
B2. "We Can Run" – 3:40

Credits and personnel
Credits are lifted from the Wild Wild West liner notes.

Studios
 Recorded at Maison Rouge, Air London, and Westside Studios (London, England)
 Mastered at Sterling Sound (New York City)

Personnel

 The Escape Club – writing
 Trevor Steel – lead vocals, guitar
 John Holliday – backing vocals, guitar
 Johnnie Christo – backing vocals, bass
 Milan Zekavica – drums, percussion
 Tessa Niles – backing vocals
 Plum – backing vocals
 Steve Pigott – keyboards
 Jon Carin – keyboards
 Alan Clark – keyboards
 Andy Duncan – percussion
 Steve Scales – percussion
 Jim Patterson – horns
 Dave Plews – horns
 Brian Brummitt – horns
 Ben Parks – horns
 Chris Kimsey – production
 John Luongo – mixing
 Christopher Marc Potter – engineering
 Gary Hellman – engineering
 George Marino – mastering

Charts

Weekly charts

Year-end charts

Certifications

References

1988 debut singles
1988 songs
Atlantic Records singles
Billboard Hot 100 number-one singles
Cashbox number-one singles
The Escape Club songs
Warner Music Group singles